Goldman's nectar bat (Lonchophylla mordax) is a bat species found in Brazil, Colombia, Costa Rica, Ecuador and Panama.

References

Bats of South America
Bats of Brazil
Mammals of Colombia
Mammals described in 1903
Lonchophylla
Taxa named by Oldfield Thomas
Bats of Central America